Phaedra, Op. 93 is a cantata for mezzo-soprano and orchestra by Benjamin Britten, written for Janet Baker.

History
Phaedra was the composer's last vocal work, written in 1975 and first performed by Dame Janet Baker at the Aldeburgh Festival on 16 June 1976. Britten assembled the libretto from parts of a translation of Racine's Phèdre by Robert Lowell. Stylistically, it draws from the Baroque cantata tradition.

References

Compositions by Benjamin Britten
Cantatas
1975 compositions
Works based on Phèdre
Phaedra